Agenor Muñiz (2 February 1910 – 28 January 1962) was a Uruguayan footballer.

Playing career

Club career
Muñiz played for Montevideo Wanderers and Peñarol in the Uruguayan national league. He made over 200 appearances for Montevideo Wanderers.

International career
Muñiz made his international debut for Uruguay national football team in December 1933. In the course of his career he played in two South American Championship winning teams. He played his last match for La Celeste  in April 1943.

References

1910 births
Uruguayan footballers
Uruguay international footballers
Peñarol players
Montevideo Wanderers F.C. players
Year of death missing
Copa América-winning players
Association football defenders